Alvarado Medical Center station is a station on San Diego Trolley's Green Line in the College Area. It is one of the San Diego Trolley network's newer stations, having opened in 2005.

The street-level station has side platforms. It is located near the intersection of Alvarado Rd. and Reservoir Dr. The station is located across the street from the Alvarado Medical Center. Besides the hospital and the College Area, portions of the residential neighborhood of Del Cerro are also accessible from the stop.

Station layout 
There are two tracks, each served by a side platform.

Alvarado riddle 

One of the most noticeable features of the station is a riddle, engraved into the tiles on the wall that separates the station from the freeway. This art installation was created by Roman De Salvo in 2005.

The riddle reads:

"Arteries, veins, and, capillaries.
For autos, rain, and, catenaries.
All three lines are side by side.

Above, below, and, stratified.
One is numbered less than nine.
Another was there at the dawn of time.

The last will be here after a wait.
Or, right away if you're not too late.

Look around to solve this riddle.
Name all three, top, bottom and middle.

If bewildered, feel the handrail.
The answer there is writ in Braille.”

See also 
 List of San Diego Trolley stations

References 

Green Line (San Diego Trolley)
San Diego Trolley stations in San Diego
Railway stations in the United States opened in 2005
2005 establishments in California